Kolkata Metropolitan Area (abbreviated KMA; formerly Calcutta Metropolitan Area), also known as Greater Kolkata, is the urban agglomeration of the city of Kolkata in the Indian state of West Bengal. It is the third most populous metropolitan area in India after Delhi and Mumbai. The area is administered by the Kolkata Metropolitan Development Authority (KMDA). The area covers four municipal corporations along with 37 municipalities. Kolkata metropolitan district was legally defined in the schedule of the Calcutta Metropolitan Planning Area (Use and Development of Land) Control Act, 1965 (West Bengal Act XIV of 1965), and, after repeal of that Act, redefined as Kolkata metropolitan area in the first schedule of West Bengal Town and Country (Planning and Development) Act, 1979 (West Bengal Act XIII of 1979).

Jurisdiction

Demographics
According to the 2011 census data, the total population of the Kolkata metropolitan area was 14,112,536. KMDA report states the total area is 1,886.67 km2, making the population density 7,480 per km2.

See also

 Mumbai metropolitan area
 Chennai metropolitan area
 Delhi metropolitan area
 List of metropolitan areas in Asia by population

References

Geography of Kolkata
Kolkata